Costas Mavrides (born 27 May 1962) is a Cypriot politician, who since 2014, has been a Member of the European Parliament, representing Cyprus. He is a member of Democratic Party.
He sits with the Progressive Alliance of Socialists and Democrats in the European Parliament.

Early life and education 
He was born in Kato Dikomo in 1962. He studied Economics at Rutgers University, and holds a PhD in Economics from Houston University.

He worked as an academic from 1995 until 2004, and taught at universities in the USA, Greece and Cyprus.

Parliamentary service
Member, Committee on Economic and Monetary Affairs
Member, Delegation to the EU-Turkey Joint Parliamentary Committee

References

Living people
1962 births
MEPs for Cyprus 2014–2019
Democratic Party (Cyprus) MEPs
MEPs for Cyprus 2019–2024
Fulbright alumni